Tembakounda in Guinea is the location of the source of the Niger River, West Africa's longest river, which eventually empties at the Niger Delta into the Gulf of Guinea  distant.  Tembakounda is in the Djallon Mountains, low mountains rising above the plateau area of the Guinea Highlands known as Fouta Djallon.
Places

References

Geography of Guinea
Niger River